Delonte Jermaine Holland (born March 2, 1982) is an American professional basketball player for who last played for Panteras de Miranda.

High school and college career
Born and raised in Greenbelt, Maryland, Holland attended high school at Eleanor Roosevelt, where he teamed with future NBA players Eddie Basden and Delonte West. He played college basketball at Independence Community College and Vincennes University, before transferring to DePaul University. He spent two years with the Blue Demons, averaging 13.9 points per game. In 2003–04, with teammate Andre Brown, Holland earned All-Conference USA Second Team honors.

Professional career
After going undrafted in the 2004 NBA Draft, Holland started his professional career with Atlas in Serbia and Montenegro, on the same team with upcoming talent Nikola Peković. In May 2005, media reported that Holland left Atlas after the invitation by the Boston Celtics to join their training camp. However, he did not enter the NBA, after which he returned to Europe, signing for the Italian team Teramo.

On March 9, 2008, while playing for Cimberio Varese, Holland scored 50 points in a home game against Armani Jeans Milano. He made 18-for-31 from the floor, including 10-of-19 on treys. Despite his remarkable achievement, Varese would go on to lose the game 90–85. On the other side, the most valuable player was Danilo Gallinari, future NBA star, with 20 points.

After participated at the 2008 New York Knicks training camp, Holland was drafted by the Rio Grande Valley Vipers of the NBA Development League, but was waived after only two games due to injured. After recovery, Holland returned to Italy, having a short spell with Roseto, before signed with the French team Besançon for the remainder of the 2008–09 season.

In June 2011, Holland started his Latin American adventure by reaching an agreement with 9 de Julio de Río Tercero in Argentina. However, he left the team in September, after playing only one game. Soon after, Holland moved to Colombia and played for Guerreros de Bogotá, but quickly returned to Argentina, where he finished the year with Atenas de Córdoba. In January 2012, Holland signed with Toros de Aragua in Venezuela. In May 2012, Holland changed team and country once again, signing with Leones de Santo Domingo in the Dominican Republic.

United States national team
Holland had represented the United States at the 2001 Tournament of the Americas.

Career statistics

References

External links
 Delonte Holland at legabasket.it
 Delonte Holland at euroleague.net
 Delonte Holland at legaduebasket.it

1982 births
Living people
African-American basketball players
American expatriate basketball people in Argentina
American expatriate basketball people in Colombia
American expatriate basketball people in France
American expatriate basketball people in Italy
American expatriate basketball people in Lebanon
American expatriate basketball people in Mexico
American expatriate basketball people in Qatar
American expatriate basketball people in Serbia
American expatriate basketball people in the Dominican Republic
American expatriate basketball people in the United Arab Emirates
American expatriate basketball people in Ukraine
American expatriate basketball people in Venezuela
Basketball players from Maryland
BC Dnipro-Azot players
Besançon BCD players
DePaul Blue Demons men's basketball players
Halcones de Xalapa players
KK Beopetrol/Atlas Beograd players
Pallacanestro Varese players
Panteras de Miranda players
People from Greenbelt, Maryland
Rio Grande Valley Vipers players
Shooting guards
Small forwards
Teramo Basket players
Vincennes Trailblazers men's basketball players
Virtus Bologna players
Independence Pirates men's basketball players
American men's basketball players
21st-century African-American sportspeople
20th-century African-American people